Although there is disagreement about the taxonomy of the genus Caladenia, the following is a list of species recognised by the Royal Botanic Gardens, Kew. Common names are mostly those given by David L. Jones, or sometimes (especially for more recently described species or subspecies), those used by Andrew Brown.
 
 Caladenia abbreviata Hopper & A.P.Br. - coastal spider orchid
 Caladenia actensis D.L.Jones & M.A.Clem. - Canberra spider orchid
 Caladenia aestiva D.L.Jones - summer spider-orchid
 Caladenia alata R.Br. - fairy caladenia
 Caladenia alpina R.S.Rogers - alpine caladenia 
 Caladenia ambusta A.P.Br. & G.Brockman - Boranup spider orchid
 Caladenia amnicola D.L.Jones - Bundarra spider orchid
 Caladenia amoena D.L.Jones - charming spider orchid
 Caladenia ampla (D.L.Jones) G.N.Backh. - dainty spider orchid
 Caladenia amplexans A.S.George  - dainty blue china orchid
 Caladenia ancylosa (D.L.Jones) G.N.Backh. - Genoa spider orchid
 Caladenia angustata Lindl. - white caps
 Caladenia anthracina D.L.Jones - black-lipped spider orchid
 Caladenia aperta (Hopper & A.P.Br.) M.A.Clem. - western tiny blue china orchid
 Caladenia applanata Hopper & A.P.Br. 
 Caladenia applanata Hopper & A.P.Br.subsp. applanata - broad-lipped spider orchid
 Caladenia applanata subsp. erubescens Hopper & A.P.Br. - rose spider orchid
 Caladenia arenaria Fitzg. - sand-hill spider orchid
 Caladenia arenicola Hopper & A.P.Br. - carousel spider orchid
 Caladenia argocalla D.L.Jones - white beauty spider orchid
 Caladenia armata (D.L.Jones) G.N.Backh.
 Caladenia arrecta Hopper & A.P.Br. - reaching spider orchid
 Caladenia ashbyae (Hopper & A.P.Br.) M.A.Clem. - powder blue china orchid
 Caladenia atradenia D.L.Jones, Molloy & M.A.Clem. - bronze fingers (N.Z.)
 Caladenia atrata D.L.Jones - dark caladenia
 Caladenia atrochila D.L.Jones 
 Caladenia atroclavia D.L.Jones & M.A.Clem. - black-clubbed spider orchid
 Caladenia atrovespa (D.L.Jones) G.N.Backh. - thin-clubbed mantis orchid
 Caladenia attenuata (Brinsley) D.L.Jones - Duramana fingers
 Caladenia attingens Hopper & A.P.Br. - mantis orchids
 Caladenia attingens subsp. attingens Hopper & A.P.Br. - forest mantis orchid
 Caladenia attingens subsp. gracillima Hopper & A.P.Br. - small mantis orchid
 Caladenia attingens subsp. effusa A.P.Br. & G.Brockman - granite mantis orchid
 Caladenia audasii R.S.Rogers - McIvor spider-orchid
 Caladenia aurantiaca (R.S.Rogers) Rupp orange-tip caladenia
 Caladenia aurulenta (D.L.Jones) R.J.Bates 
 Caladenia australis G.W.Carr - southern spider-orchid
 Caladenia barbarella Hopper & A.P.Br. - small dragon orchid
 Caladenia barbarossa Rchb.f. - common dragon orchid
 Caladenia bartlettii (Hatch) D.L.Jones
 Caladenia behrii Schltdl. - pink-lipped spider orchid
 Caladenia bicalliata R.S.Rogers
 Caladenia bicalliata R.S.Rogers subsp. bicalliata - dwarf limestone spider orchid
 Caladenia bicalliata subsp. cleistogama Hopper & A.P.Br. - sandhill spider orchid
 Caladenia bigeminata A.P.Br. & G.Brockman
 Caladenia brachyscapa G.W.Carr - short spider-orchid
 Caladenia branwhitei (D.L.Jones) G.N.Backh.
 Caladenia brevisura Hopper & A.P.Br. - short-sepalled spider orchid
 Caladenia brownii Hopper & A.P.Br. - karri spider orchid
 Caladenia brumalis D.L.Jones - winter spider orchid
 Caladenia brunonis (Endl.) Rchb.f. - purple enamel orchid
 Caladenia bryceana R.S.Rogers 
 Caladenia bryceana  R.S.Rogers  subsp. bryceana - dwarf spider orchid
 Caladenia bryceana subsp. cracens  Hopper & A.P.Br. - northern dwarf spider orchid
 Caladenia busselliana Hopper & A.P.Br. - Bussell's spider orchid
 Caladenia cadyi (D.L.Jones) G.N.Backh.
 Caladenia caerulea R.Br. - eastern tiny blue china orchid
 Caladenia caesarea (Domin) M.A.Clem. & Hopper 
 Caladenia caesarea (Domin) M.A.Clem. & Hopper subsp. caesarea - mustard spider orchid
 Caladenia caesarea subsp. maritima M.A.Clem. & Hopper - cape spider orchid
 Caladenia caesarea subsp. transiens M.A.Clem. & Hopper - dwarf mustard spider orchid
 Caladenia cairnsiana F.Muell. - zebra orchid
 Caladenia calcicola G.W.Carr - Bats Ridges spider orchid
 Caladenia callitrophila D.L.Jones - Berrigan spider orchid
 Caladenia calyciformis (R.S.Rogers) Hopper & A.P.Br. (N.Z.)
 Caladenia campbellii D.L.Jones - thick-stem caladenia
 Caladenia capillata (Tate) D.L.Jones - white daddy long legs, wispy spider orchid
 Caladenia cardiochila Tate - heart-lip spider-orchid
 Caladenia carnea R.Br. - pink fingers orchid
 Caladenia catenata (Sm.) Druce - white caladenia, white fingers and lady's fingers
 Caladenia caudata Nicholls - tailed spider orchid
 Caladenia chamaephylla D.L.Jones - redleaf fingers
 Caladenia chapmanii Hopper & A.P.Br. - Chapman's spider orchid
 Caladenia chlorostyla D.L.Jones, Molloy & M.A.Clem. 
 Caladenia christineae Hopper & A.P.Br. - Christine's spider orchid
 Caladenia citrina Hopper & A.P.Br. - Margaret River spider orchid
 Caladenia clarkiae D.L.Jones - pink caps
 Caladenia clavescens (D.L.Jones) G.N.Backh. 
 Caladenia clavigera A.Cunn. ex Lindl. - plain-lip spider-orchid
 Caladenia clavula D.L.Jones - small-clubbed spider orchid
 Caladenia cleistantha D.L.Jones - closed caladenia
 Caladenia coactilis D.L.Jones - thick fingers
 Caladenia colorata D.L.Jones - coloured spider-orchid, small western spider-orchid, painted spider-orchid
 Caladenia concinna (Rupp) D.L.Jones & M.A.Clem. - neat spider orchid
 Caladenia concolor Fitzg. - crimson spider orchid
 Caladenia conferta D.L.Jones - crowded spider orchid, coast spider orchid
 Caladenia congesta R.Br. - black-tongue caladenia
 Caladenia corynephora A.S.George - club-lipped spider orchid
 Caladenia cracens D.L.Jones 1996 - elegant caladenia
 Caladenia crebra A.S.George - Arrowsmith spider orchid
 Caladenia cremna (D.L.Jones) G.N.Backh. - Don's spider orchid
 Caladenia cretacea (D.L.Jones) G.N.Backh. - Stuart Mill spider orchid
 Caladenia cristata R.S.Rogers - crested clown orchid
 Caladenia cruciformis D.L.Jones - crucifix spider orchid
 Caladenia cruscula Hopper & A.P.Br. - reclining spider orchid
 Caladenia cucullata Fitzg. - hooded caladenia
 Caladenia curtisepala D.L.Jones - short-hooded fingers
 Caladenia decora Hopper & A.P.Br. - Esperance king spider orchid
 Caladenia denticulata Lindl.
 Caladenia denticulata Lindl. subsp. denticulata  - yellow spider orchid
 Caladenia denticulata subsp. albicans A.P.Br. & G.Brockman - alabaster spider orchid
 Caladenia denticulata subsp. rubella A.P.Br. & G.Brockman - clumped spider orchid
 Caladenia dienema D.L.Jones - windswept spider-orchid
 Caladenia dilatata R.Br. - green-comb spider-orchid
 Caladenia dimidia Hopper & A.P.Br. chameleon spider orchid
 Caladenia dimorpha Fitzg. - spicy caps
 Caladenia discoidea Lindl. - bee orchid, dancing spider orchid 
 Caladenia dorrienii Domin - Cossack spider orchid
 Caladenia dorrigoensis  D.L.Jones & L.M.Copel. 
 Caladenia douglasiorum (D.L.Jones) G.N.Backh. 
 Caladenia doutchiae O.H.Sarg. 1921 - purple-veined clown orchid
 Caladenia drakeoides Hopper & A.P.Br. - hinged dragon orchid
 Caladenia drummondii Benth. - winter spider orchid
 Caladenia dundasiae Hopper & A.P.Br. - Patricia's spider orchid
 Caladenia echidnachila Nicholls - fawn spider orchid
 Caladenia elegans Hopper & A.P.Br. - elegant spider orchid
 Caladenia emarginata (Lindl.) Rchb.f. - pink enamel orchid
 Caladenia ensata Nicholls - stumpy spider orchid
 Caladenia ensigera (D.L.Jones) R.J.Bates - large bayonet spider orchid
 Caladenia erythrochila Hopper & A.P.Br. Lake Muir spider orchid
 Caladenia erythronema A.P.Br. & G.Brockman - red thread spider orchid
 Caladenia evanescens Hopper & A.P.Br. - semaphore spider orchid
 Caladenia excelsa Hopper & A.P.Br. - giant spider orchid
 Caladenia exilis Hopper & A.P.Br. 
 Caladenia exilis Hopper & A.P.Br. subsp. exilis - salt lake spider orchid
 Caladenia exilis subsp. vanleeuwenii Hopper & A.P.Br. - Moora spider orchid
 Caladenia exstans Hopper & A.P.Br. - pointing spider orchid
 Caladenia falcata (Nicholls) M.A.Clem. & Hopper - fringed mantis orchid
 Caladenia ferruginea Nicholls – rusty spider orchid
 Caladenia filamentosa R.Br. - daddy-long-legs
 Caladenia filifera Lindl. - blood spider orchid
 Caladenia fitzgeraldii Rupp - Fitzgerald's spider orchid
 Caladenia flaccida D.L.Jones - flaccid spider orchid, ironcaps spider orchid
 Caladenia flava R.Br. 
 Caladenia flava R.Br.  subsp. flava - cowslip orchid
 Caladenia flava subsp. maculata Hopper & A.P.Br.  - Kalbarri cowslip orchid
 Caladenia flava subsp. sylvestris Hopper & A.P.Br.  - karri cowslip orchid
 Caladenia flavovirens G.W.Carr - summer spider-orchid
 Caladenia flindersica (D.L.Jones) R.J.Bates 
 Caladenia fluvialis A.P.Br. & G.Brockman - Brookton Highway spider orchid
 Caladenia footeana Hopper & A.P.Br. - crimson spider orchid 
 Caladenia formosa G.W.Carr - large crimson spider orchid, elegant spider orchid
 Caladenia fragrans (Hopper & A.P.Br.) M.A.Clem. - fragrant china orchid
 Caladenia fragrantissima D.L.Jones & G.W.Carr - scented spider orchid
 Caladenia fuliginosa (D.L.Jones) R.J.Bates
 Caladenia fulva G.W.Carr - tawny spider orchid
 Caladenia fuscata (Rchb.f.) M.A.Clem. & D.L.Jones - dusky fingers orchid
 Caladenia fuscolutescens Hopper & A.P.Br. - ochre spider orchid
 Caladenia gardneri Hopper & A.P.Br. - cherry spider orchid
 Caladenia gemmata Lindl. - blue china orchid
 Caladenia georgei Hopper & A.P.Br. - tuart spider orchid
 Caladenia gertrudae  Ostenf.  - pale china orchid
 Caladenia gladiolata R.S.Rogers - small bayonet spider orchid, smelly socks
 Caladenia gracilis R.Br. - musky caps
 Caladenia gracillima (Rupp) D.L.Jones - pretty fingers
 Caladenia graminifolia A.S.George - grass-leaved spider orchid
 Caladenia grampiana (D.L.Jones) G.N.Backh. - Grampians spider orchid
 Caladenia graniticola (Hopper & A.P.Br.) Hopper & A.P.Br. - Pingaring spider orchid
 Caladenia granitora Hopper & A.P.Br. - granite spider orchid
 Caladenia harringtoniae Hopper & A.P.Br. - pink spider orchid
 Caladenia hastata (Nicholls) Rupp Mellblom's spider-orchid
 Caladenia heberleana Hopper & A.P.Br. - Heberle's spider orchid
 Caladenia helvina D.L.Jones - summer spider orchid
 Caladenia hiemalis Hopper & A.P.Br. - dwarf common spider orchid
 Caladenia hildae Pescott & Nicholls  - golden caladenia, honey caladenia
 Caladenia hillmanii D.L.Jones - purple-heart fingers
 Caladenia hirta Lindl.
 Caladenia hirta Lindl. subsp. hirta - candy orchid
 Caladenia hirta subsp. rosea Hopper & A.P.Br. - pink candy orchid
 Caladenia hoffmanii Hopper & A.P.Br. - Hoffman's spider orchid
 Caladenia hopperiana A.P.Br., R.D.Phillips & G.Brockman 
 Caladenia horistes Hopper & A.P.Br. - cream spider orchid
 Caladenia huegelii Rchb.f. - grand spider orchid
 Caladenia incensum Hopper & A.P.Br. - glistening spider orchid
 Caladenia incrassata Hopper & A.P.Br. - puppet clown orchid
 Caladenia infundibularis A.S.George - funnel-web spider orchid
 Caladenia insularis G.W.Carr French Island spider-orchid
 Caladenia integra E.Coleman - smooth-lipped spider orchid
 Caladenia interanea  D.L.Jones & R.J.Bates 
 Caladenia interjacens Hopper & A.P.Br. - Walpole spider orchid
 Caladenia intuta D.L.Jones & R.J.Bates
 Caladenia iridescens R.S.Rogers -bronze caps
 Caladenia ixioides Lindl. 
 Caladenia javanica Benn. ex Ridl. in H.O.Forbes
 Caladenia lateritica K.W.Dixon & Christenh. - white primrose orchid
 Caladenia latifolia R.Br. - pink fairies
 Caladenia leptochila Fitzg.
 Caladenia leptochila subsp. dentata (D.L.Jones) R.J.Bates  - toothed spider orchid
 Caladenia leptochila Fitzg. subsp. leptochila - narrow-lipped spider orchid
 Caladenia leptoclavia D.L.Jones
 Caladenia leucochila A.P.Br., R.Phillips & G.Brockman
 Caladenia lindleyana (Rchb.f.) M.A.Clem. & D.L.Jones - Lindley's spider orchid
 Caladenia littoricola  R.J.Bates 
 Caladenia lobata Fitzg. - butterfly orchid 
 Caladenia lodgeana Hopper & A.P.Br. - Lodge's spider orchid
 Caladenia longicauda Lindl. 
 Caladenia longicauda subsp. albella Hopper & A.P.Br. - small-lipped white spider orchid
 Caladenia longicauda subsp. australora Hopper & A.P.Br. - southern white spider orchid
 Caladenia longicauda subsp. borealis Hopper & A.P.Br. - daddy-long-legs spider orchid
 Caladenia longicauda subsp. calcigena Hopper & A.P.Br. coastal white spider orchid
 Caladenia longicauda subsp. clivicola Hopper & A.P.Br. - Darling Scarp white spider orchid
 Caladenia longicauda subsp. crassa Hopper & A.P.Br. - Esperance white spider orchid
 Caladenia longicauda subsp. eminens (Domin) Hopper & A.P.Br. - stark white spider orchid
 Caladenia longicauda subsp. extrema A.P.Br. & G.Brockman. - late white spider orchid
 Caladenia longicauda subsp. insularis Hopper & A.P.Br. ex A.P.Br. & G.Brockman - island white spider orchid
 Caladenia longicauda subsp. longicauda - large white spider orchid
 Caladenia longicauda subsp. merrittii Hopper & A.P.Br. - Merritt's white spider orchid
 Caladenia longicauda subsp. minima A.P.Br. & G.Brockman - little white spider orchid
 Caladenia longicauda subsp. redacta Hopper & A.P.Br. - tangled white spider orchid
 Caladenia longicauda subsp. rigidula Hopper & A.P.Br. - rigid white spider orchid, island white spider orchid
 Caladenia longiclavata E.Coleman - clubbed spider orchid
 Caladenia longifimbriata Hopper & A.P.Br. - fringed spider orchid
 Caladenia longii R.S.Rogers
 Caladenia lorea Hopper & A.P.Br. - blushing spider orchid
 Caladenia lowanensis G.W.Carr - Wimmera spider-orchid
 Caladenia luteola Hopper & A.P.Br.
 Caladenia lyallii Hook.f.
 Caladenia macroclavia D.L.Jones - brown bayonets, large-club spider orchid
 Caladenia macrostylis Fitzg. - leaping spider orchid
 Caladenia magniclavata Nicholls - big clubbed spider orchid
 Caladenia magnifica (Nicholls) D.L.Jones & G.W.Carr - magnificent spider orchid
 Caladenia major (R.Br.) Rchb.f.
 Caladenia marginata Lindl. - white fairy orchid
 Caladenia maritima D.L.Jones - coastal fingers
 Caladenia melanema Hopper & A.P.Br. - ballerina orchid 
 Caladenia mentiens D.L.Jones – lesser fingers
 Caladenia meridionalis Hopper & A.P.Br. - south coast spider orchid 
 Caladenia mesocera Hopper & A.P.Br. - narrow-lipped dragon orchid
 Caladenia microchila Hopper & A.P.Br. - western wispy spider orchid
 Caladenia minor Hook.f. - white fingers
 Caladenia minorata  M.A.Clem.  - small waxlip orchid
 Caladenia montana G.W.Carr - mountain spider orchid
 Caladenia moschata (D.L.Jones) G.N.Backh.
 Caladenia multiclavia Rchb.f. - lazy spider orchid
 Caladenia nana Endl. in J.G.C.Lehmann
 Caladenia nana Endl. subsp. nana - little pink fan orchid
 [[Caladenia nana subsp. unita|Caladenia nana subsp. unita]] (W.Fitzg.) Hopper & A.P.Br. - pink fan orchid
 Caladenia necrophylla D.L.Jones - late green-comb spider orchid
 Caladenia nikulinskyae (Hopper & A.P.Br.) M.A.Clem. - Phillippa's china orchid
 Caladenia nivalis Hopper & A.P.Br. - crystalline spider orchid
 Caladenia nobilis Hopper & A.P.Br. - noble spider orchid
 Caladenia nothofageti D.L.Jones, Molloy & M.A.Clem. 
 Caladenia occidentalis Hopper & A.P.Br. - ruby spider orchid
 Caladenia oenochila G.W.Carr 1991 - red-lipped spider orchid, wine-lipped spider-orchid
 Caladenia oreophila (D.L.Jones) G.N.Backh.
 Caladenia orestes (D.L.Jones) G.N.Backh.
 Caladenia orientalis (G.W.Carr) Hopper & A.P.Br. - eastern spider orchid
 Caladenia ornata (Nicholls) D.L.Jones - ornate pink fingers
 Caladenia osmera (D.L.Jones) G.N.Backh. - pungent spider orchid
 Caladenia ovata R.S.Rogers - Kangaroo Island spider orchid
 Caladenia pachychila Hopper & A.P.Br. - dwarf zebra orchid
 Caladenia pallida Lindl. - rosy spider orchid
 Caladenia paludosa Hopper & A.P.Br. - swamp spider orchid
 Caladenia paradoxa Hopper & A.P.Br. ironcaps spider orchid
 Caladenia parva G.W.Carr - small spider orchid
 Caladenia patersonii R.Br. - Paterson's spider orchid
 Caladenia pectinata R.S.Rogers - king spider orchid
 Caladenia peisleyi (D.L.Jones) G.N.Backh.
 Caladenia pendens  Hopper & A.P.Br.
 Caladenia pendens Hopper & A.P.Br. subsp. pendens - pendant spider orchid
 Caladenia pendens subsp. talboti Hopper & A.P.Br. Talbot's spider orchid
  Caladenia perangusta A.P.Br. & G.Brockman - Boyup Brook spider orchid
 Caladenia petrensis A.P.Br. & G.Brockman - rock spider orchid
 Caladenia phaeoclavia D.L.Jones - brown-clubbed spider orchid
 Caladenia pholcoidea Hopper & A.P.Br.
 Caladenia pholcoidea subsp. augustensis Hopper & A.P.Br. - Augustus spider orchid
 Caladenia pholcoidea Hopper & A.P.Br. subsp. pholcoidea  - Albany spider orchid
 Caladenia picta (Nicholls) M.A.Clem. & D.L.Jones - painted fingers
 Caladenia pilotensis D.L.Jones – Mount Pilot spider orchid
 Caladenia plicata Fitzg. crab-lipped spider orchid
 Caladenia pluvialis A.P.Br. & G.Brockman - Yuna spider orchid
 Caladenia polychroma Hopper & A.P.Br. - Joseph's spider orchid
 Caladenia postea Hopper & A.P.Br. dark-tipped spider orchid
 Caladenia praecox Nicholls - early caps
 Caladenia procera Hopper & A.P.Br. - Carbunup spider orchid
 Caladenia prolata  D.L.Jones - long-leaf fingers
 Caladenia pulchra Hopper & A.P.Br. - slender spider orchid
 Caladenia pumila R.S.Rogers - dwarf spider-orchid
 Caladenia pusilla W.M.Curtis - tiny fingers
 Caladenia pygmaea (R.S.Rogers) R.J.Bates  
 Caladenia quadrifaria  D.L.Jones - large pink fingers
 Caladenia radialis R.S.Rogers - drooping spider orchid
 Caladenia radiata Nicholls - ray spider orchid
 Caladenia remota Hopper & A.P.Br.
 Caladenia remota subsp. parva Hopper & A.P.Br. Perenjori spider orchid
 Caladenia remota Hopper & A.P.Br. subsp. remota - outback spider orchid
 Caladenia reptans Lindl.
 Caladenia reptans subsp. impensa Hopper & A.P.Br. - pale pink fairies
 Caladenia reptans Lindl. subsp. reptans - little pink fairies
 Caladenia reticulata Fitzg. - netted Caladenia Caladenia rhomboidiformis (E.Coleman) M.A.Clem. & Hopper - diamond spider orchid
 Caladenia richardsiorum D.L.Jones - Richard's spider orchid, robe spider orchid
 Caladenia rigens D.L.Jones 
 Caladenia rigida R.S.Rogers - stiff spider orchid
 Caladenia rileyi D.L.Jones - Gillenbah spider orchid
 Caladenia robinsonii G.W.Carr - Frankston spider orchid
 Caladenia roei Benth. - common clown orchid
 Caladenia rosea K.W.Dixon & Christenh. - pink primrose orchid
 Caladenia rosella G.W.Carr - rosella spider orchid
 Caladenia saccata (R.S.Rogers) Hopper & A.P.Br.
 Caladenia saccharata Rchb.f.
 Caladenia saggicola D.L.Jones - Sagg spider orchid
 Caladenia sanguinea D.L.Jones
 Caladenia saxatilis D.L.Jones & R.J.Bates - rancid spider orchid
 Caladenia saxicola A.P.Br. & G.Brockman - banded ironstone spider orchid
 Caladenia septuosa D.L.Jones - Koppio spider orchid
 Caladenia sericea Lindl. - silky blue china orchid
 Caladenia serotina Hopper & A.P.Br. - Christmas spider orchid
 Caladenia sigmoidea R.S.Rogers
 Caladenia sp. aff. venusta G.S. Lorimer - Kilsyth South spider orchid
 Caladenia speciosa Hopper & A.P.Br. - sandplain white spider orchid
 Caladenia splendens Hopper & A.P.Br. - splendid spider orchid
 Caladenia startiorum Hopper & A.P.Br. - Start's spider orchid
 Caladenia stellata D.L.Jones - starry spider orchid
 Caladenia straminichila A.P.Br. & G.Brockman - Tenterden yellow spider orchid
 Caladenia stricta (R.J.Bates) R.J.Bates - upright spider orchid
 Caladenia strigosa (D.L.Jones) R.J.Bates 
 Caladenia subglabriphylla (R.J.Bates) M.A.Clem.  
 Caladenia subtilis D.L.Jones - delicate spider orchid
 Caladenia swartsiorum A.P.Br. & G.Brockman - Island Point spider orchid
 Caladenia sylvicola D.L.Jones - forest fingers
 Caladenia tensa G.W.Carr - rigid spider orchid
 Caladenia tentaculata Tate - eastern mantis orchid
 Caladenia tessellata Fitzg. - thick-lip spider orchid
  Caladenia testacea R.Br. - honey caps
 Caladenia thinicola Hopper & A.P.Br. - Scott River spider orchid
 Caladenia thysanochila G.W.Carr - peninsula spider orchid
 Caladenia tonellii D.L.Jones - robust fingers
 Caladenia toxochila Tate - bow-lip spider orchid
 Caladenia transitoria D.L.Jones - green caps
 Caladenia uliginosa A.S.George
 Caladenia uliginosa subsp. candicans Hopper & A.P.Br. - northern darting spider orchid
 Caladenia uliginosa subsp. patulens Hopper & A.P.Br. - frail spider orchid
 Caladenia uliginosa A.S.George subsp. uliginosa - dainty spider orchid
 Caladenia ultima Hopper & A.P.Br. - late spider orchid
 Caladenia ustulata (D.L.Jones) G.N.Backh.
 Caladenia valida (Nicholls) M.A.Clem. & D.L.Jones - robust spider orchid
 Caladenia validinervia Hopper & A.P.Br. ex A.P.Br. & G.Brockman - Lake Muir spider orchid
 Caladenia variegata Colenso
 Caladenia venusta G.W.Carr - graceful spider orchid
 Caladenia verrucosa G.W.Carr - mallee spider orchid
 Caladenia versicolor G.W.Carr - candy spider orchid
 Caladenia villosissima (G.W.Carr) Hopper & A.P.Br. - hairy spider orchid
 Caladenia viridescens Hopper & A.P.Br. - Dunsborough spider orchid
 Caladenia voigtii Hopper & A.P.Br. - Mohawk clown orchid
 Caladenia vulgaris D.L.Jones - summer fingers
 Caladenia vulgata Hopper & A.P.Br. - common spider orchid 
 Caladenia wanosa A.S.George - Kalbarri spider orchid
 Caladenia whiteheadii (D.L.Jones) G.N.Backh.
 Caladenia williamsiae Hopper & A.P.Br. - Judy's spider orchid
 Caladenia winfieldii Hopper & A.P.Br. - majestic spider orchid
 Caladenia woolcockiorum D.L.Jones - Woolcock's spider orchid
 Caladenia xantha Hopper & A.P.Br. - primrose spider orchid
 Caladenia xanthochila D.Beards. & C.Beards - yellow-lip spider orchid
 Caladenia xantholeuca D.L.Jones - Flinders fingers
 Caladenia zephyra (D.L.Jones) R.J.Bates 

 Natural hybrids 

 Caladenia × aestantha Hopper & A.P.Br. 2001 (C. corynephora × C. serotina) (synonym : Arachnorchis x aestantha (Hopper & A.P.Br.) D.L.Jones & M.A.Clem, 2005)
 Caladenia × cala Hopper & A.P.Br. 2001 (C. falcata × C. longicauda)
 Caladenia × coactescens Hopper & A.P.Br. 2001 (C. crebra × C. longicauda) (synonym : Arachnorchis  × coactescens (Hopper & A.P.Br.) D.L.Jones & M.A.Clem 2005)
 Caladenia × eludens Hopper & A.P.Br. 2001 (C. chapmanii × C. splendens)
 Caladenia × enigma Hopper & A.P.Br. 2001 (C. barbarossa × C. longicauda)
 Caladenia × ericksonae Nicholls 1950 (C. cairnsiana × C. filifera)
 Caladenia × erminea Hopper & A.P.Br. 2001 (C. flava × C. marginata)
 Caladenia × exoleta Hopper & A.P.Br. 2001 (C. dimidia × C. roei)
 Caladenia × exserta Hopper & A.P.Br. 2001 (C. longicauda × C. uliginosa) (synonym : Arachnorchis × exserta (Hopper & A.P.Br.) D.L.Jones & M.A.Clem 2005)
 Caladenia × hypata Hopper & A.P.Br. 2001 (C. lobata × C. longicauda) (synonym : Arachnorchis × hypata (Hopper & A.P.Br.) D.L.Jones & M.A.Clem 2005)
 Caladenia × idiastes Hopper & A.P.Br. 2001 (C. gardneri × C. latifolia)
 Caladenia × lavandulacea R.S.Rogers 1927 (C. denticulata × C. doutchiae)
 Caladenia × ornata Hopper & A.P.Br. 2001 (C. drakeoides × C. exilis)
 Caladenia × resupina Hopper & A.P.Br. 2001 (C. horistes × C. multiclavia)
 Caladenia × spectabilis Hopper & A.P.Br. 2001 (C. flava × C. latifolia)
 Caladenia × suffusa Hopper & A.P.Br. 2001 (C. hirta × C. longicauda) (synonym : Arachnorchis × suffusa (Hopper & A.P.Br.) D.L.Jones & M.A.Clem 2005)
 Caladenia × triangularis R.S.Rogers 1927 (C. flava × C. longicauda)
 Caladenia × tryphera Hopper & A.P.Br. 2001 (C. microchila × C. sigmoidea)
 Caladenia × variabilis Nicholls 1950 (C. cardiochila × C. fragrantissima)

 Intergeneric hybrid 
 xCalassodia (Caladenia x  Glossodia'')

References

 List of Caladenia species
Caladenia
Caladenia species
Caladenia